Louis Hasenknopf (born 1 November 1890, date of death unknown) was an Austrian skeleton racer who competed in the late 1920s. He finished eighth in the men's skeleton event at the 1928 Winter Olympics in St. Moritz.

References

Austrian male skeleton racers
Year of death missing
Skeleton racers at the 1928 Winter Olympics
1890 births
Olympic skeleton racers of Austria